Markus Koob (born 5 December 1977) is a German politician of the Christian Democratic Union (CDU) who has been serving as a member of the Bundestag from the state of Hesse since 2013.

Political career 
Koob first became a member of the Bundestag in the 2013 German federal election. In parliament, served on the Finance Committee and the Committee on Family Affairs, Senior Citizens, Women and Youth until moving to the Committee on Foreign Affairs in 2018. He is parliamentary group's rapporteur on relations to India, Central Africa and West Africa.

In addition to his committee assignments, Koob is part of the German Parliamentary Friendship Group with Romania, Bulgaria and Moldova.

References

External links 

 Bundestag biography 

1977 births
Living people
Members of the Bundestag for Hesse
Members of the Bundestag 2021–2025
Members of the Bundestag 2017–2021
Members of the Bundestag 2013–2017
Members of the Bundestag for the Christian Democratic Union of Germany